A fawn is a young deer.

Fawn may also refer to:

Places

Canada
Fawn Island
Fawn Lake, Alberta, a locality
Fawn River (Ontario), Kenora District, Northwestern Ontario

United States
Fawn, Missouri
Fawn Grove, Pennsylvania
Fawn Lake (New York)
Fawn Lake Township, Minnesota
Fawn Pond (Massachusetts)
Fawn River (Michigan)
Fawn River Township, Michigan
Fawn Township, Allegheny County, Pennsylvania
Fawn Township, York County, Pennsylvania
Rising Fawn, Georgia

Other uses
 Fawn River State Fish Hatchery, a historic hatchery near Orland, Indiana
 Fawn (colour)
 Fairey Fawn, a British single-engine light bomber of the 1920s
 Fleet Fawn, a single-engine, two-seat training aircraft produced in the 1930s
 HMS Fawn, the name of several ships in the British Navy
 The Fawn (album), by The Sea and Cake
 Parasitaster, or The Fawn, a 1604 play by John Marston
 USS Fawn (1863), a steamer
 Fawn, a Disney Fairies franchise character

People with the given name
Fawn M. Brodie (1915–1981), American biographer and historian.
Fawn Hall (born 1959), notable figure in the Iran-Contra affair.
Fawn Johnson, American journalist.
Fawn Rogers, American contemporary artist.
Fawn Sharp (born 1970), Native American politician, attorney, and policy advocate.
Fawn Silver, American actress active between 1965–1972.
Fawn Weaver (born 1976), American entrepreneur, historian, and author.
Fawn Yacker, American filmmaker, producer and cinematographer.

People with the surname 

 James Fawn (1847–1923), British music hall comic entertainer.

See also
Faun (disambiguation)
Fon (disambiguation)
Phon, a unit of loudness